Cohen's cryptosystem is a public-key cryptosystem proposed in 1998 by Bram Cohen.

Key generation

In Cohen's cryptosystem, private key is a positive integer .

The algorithm uses  public-keys  defined as follows:

Where  is some bound.

Define .

Encrypting a bit

To encrypt a bit  Alice randomly adds  public keys and multiplies the result by either 1 (if she wishes to send a 0) or by −1 (if she wishes to send a 1) to obtain the ciphertext .

De-cryption

To de-crypt, Bob computes 

It is easy to see that if  then . However, if  then . Hence Bob can read the bit sent by Alice on the most significant bit of h.

References

Public-key cryptography